California's 11th congressional district is a congressional district in the U.S. state of California and is represented by Nancy Pelosi. 

Before redistricting, the 11th district consisted of most of Contra Costa County. Mark DeSaulnier, a Democrat, represented the district from January 2015 to January 2023. Cities and CDPs in the district included Alamo, Bay Point, Blackhawk, Clayton, Concord, Diablo, El Cerrito, El Sobrante, Kensington, Lafayette, Moraga, Orinda, Pinole, Pittsburg, Pleasant Hill, San Pablo, Richmond, and Walnut Creek; most of Danville; and parts of Antioch and Martinez.

Following redistricting in 2023 by the California Citizens Redistricting Commission, the 11th district is entirely in San Francisco, and includes most of the city with the exception of the Excelsior District, Visitacion Valley, Portola, and Ocean View on the city's southern edge. Former Speaker of the House Nancy Pelosi will represent the new 11th district.

Recent election results from statewide races

Composition

Due to the 2020 redistricting, California's 11th district has effectively been shifted to the former geography of the 12th district. The district encompasses the city of San Francisco almost entirely, except for the neighborhoods of Crocker Amazon, Excelsior, Little Hollywood, Mission Terrace, Oceanview, Outer Mission, Portola, and Visitacion Valley.

Cities
 San Francisco - 815,201

List of members representing the district

Election results

1912

1914

1916

1918

1920

1922

1924

1926

1928

1930

1932

1934

1936

1938

1940

1942

1944

1946

1948

1950

1952

1954

1956

1958

1960

1962

1964

1966

1967 (Special)

1968

1970

1972

1974

1976

1978

1979 (Special)

1980

1982

1984

1986

1988

1990

1992

1994

1996

1998

2000

2002

2004

2006

2008

2010

2012

2014

2016

2018

2020

2022

See also
List of United States congressional districts

References

External links
GovTrack.us: California's 11th congressional district
RAND California Election Returns: District Definitions (out of date)
California Voter Foundation map - CD11 (out of date)

1913 establishments in California
Constituencies established in 1913
11
Congressional district 11
Government of Contra Costa County, California
Berkeley Hills
Antioch, California
Concord, California
Danville, California
El Cerrito, California
Lafayette, California
Orinda, California
Pittsburg, California
Richmond, California
Walnut Creek, California